Vasyl' Mykolayovych Verkhovynets' (1880 - 1938) was an actor, conductor, composer, voice teacher, amateur musicologist, balletmaster, choreographer and dance ethnographer He is credited for fundamentally altering the course of Ukrainian dance by devising a method of transcribing dance to paper, recording traditional dances and steps from numerous villages, setting dances on a stage, and fostering generations of Ukrainian dance researchers and practitioners. He was also the founder of the modern three-part hopak.

Vasyl' Verkhovynets' was born "Vasyl' Kostiv" in Myzun, on January 5, 1880.

References

In English:
 Shatulsky, Myron (1980). The Ukrainian Folk Dance, Kobzar Publishing Co. Ltd. .
 Zerebecky, Bohdan (1985). Ukrainian Dance Resource Booklets, Series I-IV, Ukrainian Canadian Committee, Saskatchewan Provincial Council.

In Ukrainian:
 Avramenko, Vasyl (1947). Ukrainian National Dances, Music, and Costumes, National Publishers, Ltd.
 Humeniuk, Andriy (1962). Ukrainian Folk Dance, Academy of Sciences Ukrainian of the SSR.
 Humeniuk, Andriy (1963). Folk Choreographic Art of Ukraine, Academy of Sciences of the Ukrainian SSR.
 Verkhovynets’, Vasyl’ (1912). Ukrainian Wedding.
 Verkhovynets’, Vasyl’(1919). Theory of Ukrainian Folk Dance.
 Verkhovynets’, Vasyl’ (1925). Vesnyanochka State Publishers of the Ukraine.
 Verkhovynets’, Yaroslav (1963). Biographical outline of Vasyl' Verkhovynets' in the third edition of Theory of Ukrainian Folk Dance, State Publishers of Pictorial Art and Musical Literature.

Ukrainian male dancers
Dance teachers
Ukrainian choreographers
1880 births
1938 deaths
Ukrainian musicologists
Ukrainian ethnographers
Ukrainian music educators
Folk dancers
20th-century musicologists